Ilès Ziane Cherif (born April 7, 1984 in Saïda) is an Algerian football player. He currently plays for USM El Harrach in the Algerian Ligue Professionnelle 1.

On April 5, 2008 he was called up by the Algerian A' National Team for a game against USM Blida on April 11.

Statistics

External links
 DZFoot.com Profile

References

1984 births
Algeria A' international footballers
Algeria youth international footballers
Algeria under-23 international footballers
Algerian footballers
Algerian Ligue Professionnelle 1 players
Algerian Ligue 2 players
ASO Chlef players
People from Saïda
Living people
MC Saïda players
Olympique de Médéa players
USM Alger players
USM El Harrach players
Association football defenders
21st-century Algerian people